Strabane was a constituency represented in the Irish House of Commons until 1800.

Members of Parliament

Notes and references

 – Abercorn to Balmerino

Further reading

External links
 
Parliamentary Memoirs of Fermanagh and Tyrone, from 1613 to 1885

Constituencies of the Parliament of Ireland (pre-1801)
Historic constituencies in County Tyrone
Strabane
1800 disestablishments in Ireland
Constituencies disestablished in 1800